Chaetophyllopsis is a genus of liverworts belonging to the family Cephaloziellaceae.

The species of this genus are found in Australia.

Species:
 Chaetophyllopsis whiteleggei (Carrington & Pearson) R.M.Schust. ex Hamlin

References

Jungermanniales
Jungermanniales genera